Édgar Alejandro Sosa Medina (born 23 August 1979) is a Mexican professional boxer. He is the former WBC Light flyweight champion and went on to make ten title defenses.

Professional career
Sosa suffered losses in the early part of his career, the first one came against another future Mexican light flyweight champion Ulises Solís. He faced off against Solis in a rematch in 2003 but lost once again. Sosa would then score fourteen straight victories including a win over future light flyweight champion Gilberto Keb Baas and former two time minimum weight champion Noel Arambulet.

WBC Light Flyweight Championship
On April 14, 2007, Sosa won the WBC Light Flyweight Championship by besting former champion Brian Viloria by unanimous decision. Sosa went on to successfully defend his title ten times.

In April 2009, he also got a 4th-round technical knockout victory over Porsawan Popramook.

Controversial title defense
On November 21, 2009, Sosa lost his title to Rodel Mayol. In the second round, Sosa was badly hurt by a headbutt from Mayol, sending Sosa to the canvas and causing him to sustain an injury which was later determined to be a triple-fracture. The referee ruled the headbutt as an unintentional foul and deducted a point from Mayol. After the ringside doctor inspected the wound, the referee allowed the fight to continue despite Sosa still being groggy from the injury. When the action resumed, Sosa was dropped and the referee waved it off moments later. Sosa, who required a metal plate to be implanted on his cheekbone due to multiple fractures, filed a protest with the WBC to have the decision changed to a "no contest".

Due to the controversial nature of his defeat the WBC have declared Sosa a "champion emeritus" and he is entitled to either a rematch with Mayol, or a fight with flyweight champion Pongsaklek Wonjongkam, once Sosa has recovered from his injuries. Sosa had discussed moving up in weight before his controversial loss.

See also
List of WBC world champions
List of Mexican boxing world champions

References

External links

Boxers from Mexico City
World boxing champions
World Boxing Council champions
World light-flyweight boxing champions
Light-flyweight boxers
1979 births
Living people
Mexican male boxers